Events from the year 1970 in Denmark.

Incumbents
 Monarch –  Frederick IX
 Prime minister – Jens Otto Krag

Events

 2 February – An unofficial 24-hour strike closed all Danish shipyards. The strikers were demanding a one krone an hour increase in wages to compensate for tax increases.
 6 February – A further 24-hour unofficial strike in the Danish shipyards to protest at the forced resignation of 26 union stewards that had organised the 2 February strike.
 1 April – The 1970 Danish Municipal Reform reduces the number of municipalities from 1,098 to 277 and the number of counties from 25 to 14. The reform also abolishes the last privileges for market towns.
 17 August  The University of Copenhagen hosts the opening meeting of the 4th Archeological Congres in Copenhagen.

Sports
 4 July  Mogens Frey wins stage 8 of the 1970 Tour de France.
 	3–6 September  Jørgen Engelbrecht and Niels Henry Secher win gold in M2x  at the 1970 World Rowing Championships-

Births
 20 July – Mette Blomsterberg, pastry cook and television personality
 27 July – Nikolaj Coster-Waldau, Danish actor and screenwriter
 29 September – Nicolas Winding Refn, film director

Deaths
 4 January – Prince Viggo (76), equestrian sportsman (born 1893)
 19 February – Aage Leidersdorff (59), fencer (born 1910)
 14 June – Frederik Marcus Knuth, taxonomist and count of Knuthenborg (born 1904)
 4 October – Christian Thomas, gymnast (born 1896)
 3 November – Fleming Lynge, screenwriter (born 1896)
 November 30 – Vagn Bennike (82), Army engineer and second world war resistance leader in Jutland (born 1888)

See also
1970 in Danish television

References

 
Denmark
Years of the 20th century in Denmark
1970s in Denmark